Hans Georg Pescher (born April 25, 1931) was a professional ice hockey player. He represented Germany in the 1952 Winter Olympics.

References

External links
 

1931 births
Living people
German ice hockey centres
Ice hockey players at the 1952 Winter Olympics
Olympic ice hockey players of Germany
Sportspeople from Krefeld